A Court of Thorns and Roses is a new adult fantasy novel series by American author Sarah J. Maas, beginning with the novel of the same name, released in May 2015. The story follows the journey of mortal Feyre Archeron after she is brought into the faerie lands of Prythian for murdering a faerie, and the epic love story and fierce struggle that follows after she enters the fae lands.

The series is a New York Times Best Seller and has been optioned by Hulu for a television series adaptation by Ronald D. Moore.

Books

Main

Companions
 A Court of Thorns and Roses Coloring Book (2017)

Development
Maas initially intended the series as a retelling of the fairy tales Beauty and the Beast, East of the Sun and West of the Moon, and Tam Lin. These tales inspired the finished series, though it was not ultimately a dedicated retelling.

She began writing A Court of Thorns and Roses in early 2009, with the first draft taking about five weeks to complete.

A Court of Mist and Furys first draft was written entirely in a split point of view between Feyre and Rhys. The second book went through multiple name changes, including A Court of Wind and Stone, A Court of Calm and Fury, A Court of Stars and Smoke, A Court of Wings and Stars, A Court of Venom and Silver and A Court of Stars and Frost. Like the first novel, the second is based upon multiple fairy tales and myths, including Hades and Persephone, where the Greek mythology inspired characters such as Rhysand and Feyre and their home in the Night Court. Other fairy tale inspirations include Hansel and Gretel, which spawned the character of the Weaver, and the Book of Exodus, which loosely inspired parts of the backstory for Miryam and Drakon.

The final cover of A Court of Wings and Ruin was designed by Adrian Dadich, with the dress pictured on the cover originally designed by Charlie Bowater and later adapted by Dadich.

On July 12, 2016, Entertainment Weekly reported that Maas was writing five new books for the series, which would include two novellas and three further novels which would be set before and after the first trilogy.

In 2020, the series was reprinted and published by Bloomsbury with new illustrated covers. A Court of Thorns and Roses has existed in the gray area between Young Adult and New Adult fiction since the publication of the first book. At the time A Court of Thorns and Roses was published, the New Adult categorization had not caught on the way publishers hoped it would. Maas agreed to publish the book as YA so long as her editor did not censor any of the sexual content. The A Court of Thorns and Roses series is now firmly classified as New Adult.

Awards and nominations

Accolades

Adaptations 
A Court of Thorns and Roses was optioned by Jo Bamford's and Piers Tempest's Tempo Productions in November 2015. The producers revealed in 2018 they had hired Rachel Hirons to work as the movie's screenwriter.

In March 2021, it was announced that A Court of Thorns and Roses series had been opted for a television adaptation by 20th Television for Hulu. The series is set to be developed by Ronald D. Moore alongside Maas. In an interview with The New York Times, Maas confirmed that she was developing the project with the writers and the showrunner as the executive producer of the adaptation.

References

Book series introduced in 2012
Fantasy novel series
American fantasy novels
Novels set in fictional countries
Young adult fantasy novels
Censored books
Bloomsbury Publishing books